Starr Walton (born May 13, 1942) is an American alpine skier. She competed in the women's downhill at the 1964 Winter Olympics.

References

External links
 

1942 births
Living people
American female alpine skiers
Olympic alpine skiers of the United States
Alpine skiers at the 1964 Winter Olympics
People from Yuba City, California
21st-century American women